The Polytechnic University of the Philippines – San Juan Campus (abbreviated as PUPSJ or PUPSJC and also known as PUP San Juan) is one of the campuses of the Polytechnic University of the Philippines located in Addition Hills, San Juan, Metro Manila, Philippines. It was created through a Memorandum of Agreement between PUP and the San Juan city government in 2008, converting the Addition Hills Elementary School as one of the campus of PUP, making it the only community college in the locality.

It is composed of the College of Accountancy and Finance, the College of Public Administration, the College of Computer and Information Sciences, the College of Education, and the College of Tourism and Hotel and Restaurant Management.

Academics
PUP San Juan is composed of five colleges which are extensions of the colleges from PUP Manila. The five colleges are the College of Accountancy and Finance, the College of Public Administration, the College of Computer and Information Sciences, the College of Education, and the College of Tourism and Hotel and Restaurant Management. Students are transferred to PUP Manila to complete their final year in their chosen course.

References

External links
 Polytechnic University of the Philippines – Official website

Polytechnic University of the Philippines
Educational institutions established in 2008
2008 establishments in the Philippines
State universities and colleges in Metro Manila
Education in San Juan, Metro Manila